Sheikh Ahmed Al Maktoum may refer to a person from Dubai royal house Al Maktoum with the given name Ahmed:
Ahmad bin Mohammad bin Hasher Al Maktoum (born 1963), Olympic gold medal winner from UAE
Ahmed bin Rashid Al Maktoum (born 1950), Deputy Chairman of Dubai Police & Public Security
Ahmed bin Saeed Al Maktoum (born 1958), Businessman